The Church of the Good Shepherd is a historic Episcopal church located on the Onondaga Indian Reservation near Syracuse, Onondaga County, New York. It is an older building that was remodeled in 1869-1870 for Episcopal worship.  It is a one-story, rectangular frame church with Gothic Revival style design elements.  The three bay by three bay building has a projecting entrance topped by a one-stage bell tower.  The building features pointed arched openings.

It was listed on the National Register of Historic Places in 1997.

Gallery

References

Churches in Onondaga County, New York
Buildings and structures in Syracuse, New York
National Register of Historic Places in Onondaga County, New York
Churches on the National Register of Historic Places in New York (state)
Churches completed in 1870
19th-century Episcopal church buildings
Episcopal church buildings in New York (state)
Carpenter Gothic church buildings in New York (state)
1869 establishments in New York (state)